The Pisces Dwarf, also known as Pisces I, is an irregular dwarf galaxy that is part of the Local Group.  The galaxy, taking its name from the constellation Pisces where it appears, is suspected of being a satellite galaxy of the Triangulum Galaxy (M33). It displays a blueshift, as it is approaching the Milky Way at 287 km/s. It may be transition-type galaxy, somewhere between dwarf spheroidal and dwarf irregular. Alternatively, it may be a rare, but statistically acceptable, version of one of the two types.

History 
It was discovered by Valentina Karachentseva in 1976.

Star formation history 
Apparently, the star formation rate in the Pisces Dwarf has been declining for the past 10 billion years. Most of the galaxy's stars were formed in its early years, about 8 billion years ago. The study has also shown that there has been no significant star formation for the past 100 million years. Hence, most of the stars that populate this galaxy are old, metal-rich stars aged about 2.5 billion years. However, there are small clusters of young, hot, blue stars on the outer areas of the galaxy.

References

External links
 

Dwarf irregular galaxies
Dwarf spheroidal galaxies
Peculiar galaxies
Local Group
Triangulum Subgroup
Pisces (constellation)
03792
?